Zygmunt Vetulani may refer to:

 Zygmunt Vetulani (diplomat) (1894–1942), diplomat and economist
 Zygmunt Vetulani (computer scientist) (born 1950), mathematician and computer scientist